The Kamby Lama of Tuva, or Supreme Lama of Tuva, is the highest Buddhist religious authority and most senior Buddhist monastic lama in Tuva, a largely Buddhist republic of Russia. The Kamby Lama is considered the leader of all Tuvan Buddhists.  The institute and title of Kamby Lama was revived in October 1997 during the resurgence of Buddhism in Tuva following the collapse of the Soviet Union. Buddhism had been suppressed in Tuva throughout the Soviet era.

Following the death of the 8th Kamby Lama, Jampel Lodoy, on June 23, 2020, Gelek Natsyk Dorju was elected as his successor on October 4, 2020

History
Following the fall of the Soviet Union, Kazak Orgudaevich Sandak (1918–1997) performed the duties of Supreme Lama of Tuva from 1991 until his death in 1997, but he did not possess the title of Kamby Lama.

The position of Kamby Lama of Tuva, or Supreme Lama, was officially revived and created in October 1997. The Kamby Lama is democratically elected by a congress, or Khural, of Tuvan Buddhist clergy and religious leaders for a five-year term. Elections take place every five years, unless the incumbent Kamby Lama resigns or dies in office.

 was elected as the first official Kamby Lama in October 1997. However, Khertek when stepped down as Kamby Lama during his term to continue his Buddhist education in India, Tibetan monk Pende Gyaltsen briefly served as acting Kamby Lama at the request of the Tuvan Buddhist community.

Tuva's most recent Supreme Lama, Jampel Lodoy (born Apysh-ool Sat, 1975–2020), served as the 8th Kamby Lama from November 29, 2019, until his death on June 23, 2020, from COVID-19 during the pandemic in Russia. Had he survived COVID-19, Jampel Lodoy would have served as Kamby Lama until the end of his term in 2024. The late Jampel Lodoy had also served as the 5th Kamby Lama from 2005 to 2010. 

Following Jampel Lodoy's death, it was announced that Omak Bashky would temporarily assume the role of acting leader of Tuva's community Buddhist community until a new Kamby Lama is chosen. The 9th Kamby Lama is expected to be elected in early Fall 2020.

Kamby Lama 
The position of Kamby Lama was officially revived in 1997. There have been eight Kamby Lamas between 1997 and 2020. The Kamby Lama is elected on a democratic basis for a five-year term.

References

Kamby Lamas of Tuva
Tuvan people
Russian Buddhist monks